Piolo José Nonato Pascual (screen name: Piolo Pascual, born January 12, 1977, in Manila, Philippines) is a film and television actor, recording artist and songwriter, concert performer, host, product endorser, professional dancer, and film producer in the Philippines.

Awards

Film and television awards

Music awards

In the Philippines, a gold award means selling in excess of 12,500 units and a platinum award means selling in excess of 25,000 units.
Pascual's album "Piolo Pascual: Platinum Hits" was repackaged. "Ikaw Lamang", the theme song of the teleserye "Sa Piling Mo" was added.
Sana'y Malaman Mo (lyrics: Ogie Alcasid, music: Louie Ocampo) was featured in the 2006 film Don't Give Up on Us.
Paano Kita Iibigin (lyrics and music: Ogie Alcasid) was the theme song of the movie with the same title released in 2007.

Box-office and entertainment industry awards

Nominations

Film nominations (in producing)

Film nominations (in acting)

Television nominations

Recording and Concert nominations

Box-office and entertainment industry nominations

References

External links

Lists of awards received by Filipino actor